Congoglanis inga is a species of catfish in the genus Congoglanis. It lives in the Congo River near the Inga I Dam in the Democratic Republic of the Congo. Its length reaches 11.1 cm.

References 

Amphiliidae
Freshwater fish of Africa
Fish described in 2011